The Diocese of Milwaukee could refer to;

 Roman Catholic Archdiocese of Milwaukee
 Episcopal Diocese of Milwaukee